Giorgio Samorini (born 1957 in Bologna, Italy) is a psychedelics researcher.  He has published many essays and monographs regarding the use of psychoactive compounds and sacred plants. He was a frequent contributor to, and sometime editor of Eleusis the Journal of Psychoactive Plants & Compounds.

Bibliography

Books
 Animals and Psychedelics: The Natural World and the Instinct to Alter Consciousness (2000). Giorgio Samorini. Park Street Press. .
 Samorini G., 1995, Gli Allucinogeni Nel Mito. Racconti sull'origine delle piante psicoattive. Nautilus Press, Torino.
 Samorini G., 1996, L'erba di Carlo Erba. Per una storia della canapa indiana in Italia (1845–1948), Nautilus, Torino.
 Samorini G., 2001, Funghi allucinogeni. Studi etnomicologici, Telesterion, Dozza BO. .
 Samorini G., 2002, Animals and Drugs. The Natural World and the Instinct to Alter Consciousness, Rochester, Vermont. .
 Samorini G., 2012, Droghe tribali, Shake Edizioni, Milano. .
 Samorini G., 2016, Jurema, la pianta della visione. Dai culti del Brasile alla Psiconautica di frontiera, Shake Edizioni, Milano. .
 D'Arienzo A. & Samorini G., 2019, Terapie psichedeliche. Dal paradigma psicotomimetico all´approccio neurofenomenologico, vol. 1&2, Milano, Shake, ISBN 9788897109792.

Publications

 Selected archives of: Eleusis: the Journal of Psychoactive Plants & Compounds.
 Samorini G. & F. Festi, 1989, "Le micotossicosi psicotrope volontarie in Europa: osservazioni sui casi clinici", in Atti I Convegno Nazionale sugli Avvelenamenti da Funghi, Rovereto 22-23 Ottobre 1988, Annali Museo Civico Rovereto, Suppl. vol. 4: 251-257.
 Samorini G., 1993, "Funghi allucinogeni italiani", in Atti II Convegno Nazionale Avvelenamenti da Funghi, Rovereto 3-4 aprile 1992, Annali Museo Civico Rovereto, Suppl. vol. 8: 125-149.
 Gartz Jochen, Giorgio Samorini & Francisco Festivities, 1996, “On the presumed French case of fatality for ingestion of funghetti”, Eleusis, n. 6, pp. 3–13.
 Samorini G., 1995, "Kuda-kallu: umbrella-stones or mushroom-stones? (Kerala, Southern India)", Integration, 6: 33-40.
 Samorini G. & G. Camilla, 1995, "Rappresentazioni fungine nell'arte greca", Annali Museo Civico Rovereto, 10: 307-326.
 Giorgio Samorini, “The ‘Mushroom-Tree’ of Plaincourault”, Eleusis: Journal of Psychoactive Plants and Compounds, n. 8, 1997, pp. 29–37.
 Giorgio Samorini, “The ‘Mushroom-Trees’ in Christian Art”, Eleusis: Journal of Psychoactive Plants and Compounds, n. 1, 1998, pp. 87–108.
 Samorini G., 1998, "The Pharsalus Bas-Relief and the Eleusinian Mysteries", The Entheogen Review, 7(2): 60-63.
 Samorini Giorgio, 2001, “Fungi hallucinogens. Etnomicologici studies”, Telesterion, Dozza BO, pag. 248
 Samorini G., 2001, "New Data from the Ethnomycology of Psychoactive Mushrooms", International Journal of Medicinal Mushrooms, vol. 3, pp. 257–278.
 Samorini G., 1992, "The oldest representations of hallucinogenic mushrooms in the world (Sahara Desert, 9000-7000 BP)", Integration, 2/3: 69-78.
 Samorini G., 1996, "Colliri visionari", Eleusis, 5: 27-32. 
 Samorini G., 1997–98, "The Initiation Rite in the Bwiti Religion (Ndea Narizanga Sect, Gabon)", Jahrbuch für Ethnomedizine, vol. 6-7, pp. 39–55.
 Samorini G., 2002, "A contribution to the ethnomycology and ethnobotany of Alpine psychoactive vegetals", Acta Phytotherapeutica, 3° s., 2: 59-65.
 Samorini G., 2002–2003, The ancestor cult Byeri and the psychoactive plant alan (Alchornea floribunda) among the Fang of Western Equatorial Africa", Eleusis, n.s., vol. 6/7, pp. 29–55.
 Samorini G., 2003–04, "Il dio egiziano Min e la lattuga. Un contributo etnobotanico a un enigma dell'egittologia", Archeologia Africana, Centro Studi Archeologia Africana, Museo Civico di Milano, vol. 9-10, pp. 73–84.
 Samorini G., 2006, "Lattuga e lattucario. Storia di equivoci ed enigmi insoluti", Erboristeria Domani, n. 299, gennaio, pp. 49–55.

External links
Samorini.it – Official site (In Italian, many articles in the section Documentation in English)
Video of his conference at the 2015 National Botanical Congress of Colombia in Spanish: Aspectos y problemas de la arqueología de las plantas embriagantes de Sudamérica.

Psychedelic drug researchers
Living people
1957 births
Ethnobotanists
Psychedelic drug advocates